Senet Inc. is an American Low Power Wide Area Network (LPWAN) provider for IoT/M2M applications.  The Senet Network is described as "the first and only public provider of LPWA networks with class leading LoRa® modulation for IoT/M2M applications in North America”. Its platform is positioned to meet the needs of the growing “Internet of Things” (IoT) ecosystem.

The Senet Network adheres to the open global networking standards as proposed by the LoRa® Alliance, and enables low power, machine to machine (M2M) connectivity across wide geographic areas. It is designed to remove the barriers traditionally associated with managing remote devices such as reliability, range, battery life, bidirectional capability, mobility, and cost.

History 
Senet’s origins began in 2009 with EnerTrac, a fuel delivery automation solution that remotely monitors propane and oil tanks for the residential heating industry.  By reducing unnecessary deliveries and runouts, EnerTrac reduces operational costs for fuel delivery companies.

The success of the EnerTrac solution prompted EnerTrac to consider its technology for other markets, and in 2014 the company was restructured as Senet Inc., a public LPWA Network. The Senet Network is designed to accommodate other applications, such as water metering, smart building and smart agriculture. EnerTrac was renamed to EnerTracSE, and the EnerTracSE heating fuel delivery automation solution continued to be one of Senet’s significant offerings until the company sold that business to Independent Technologies, Inc.

Senet joined the LoRa® Alliance in 2015 and deployed LoRaWAN technology into the Senet Network. With this deployment the Senet Network became the first IoT network in North America to adopt the LoRa networking standards.

Technology

The Senet Network 
The Senet Network is differentiated from other LPWANs by being an open standards network that is known for deploying and running the largest revenue-generating application.

The Senet Network’s fully enabled two-way architecture provides data communication from sensors over long distances at a lower cost, longer range, and longer battery life than cellular networks. Battery life is determined by how often the devices are set to transmit data and how much data is being transmitted. Transceiver batteries can last as long as 10 years.

Senet partnered with the LoRa® Alliance and Semtech to incorporate LoRaWAN technology into the Senet Network. With the deployment of LoRaWAN technology, the Senet Network provides unique benefits that are not found in other LPWAN technologies. These benefits include bidirectional communication, mobile device support, adaptive data rate support, and strong built-in security features using AES-128 CCM.

Associations

LoRa® Alliance & Semtech 
As of February 2016, the LoRa®  Alliance is made up of more than 200 members that use the global adoption of LoRaWAN open networking standards for their IoT networks.  LoRa® technology provides wireless range without repeaters, which simplifies system design and lowers the total cost of deployment.

The Senet Network uses the open standard protocol LoRaWAN which has been designed to provide low-lost, mobile, secure and bidirectional communication in IoT. The LoRaWAN architecture allows data to be sent between devices and a central network server.

Senet also employs Semtech RF-transceivers with the LoRa® model to achieve a range of up to 15 miles in rural areas, while consuming very little power.

Coverage 
As of February 2016, the Senet Network has more than 115,000 square miles of coverage in the Northeast (New England and New York), the Midwest (Iowa and Missouri), and California (San Francisco and the Central Valley). Senet Network deployment is growing in North America and Senet has future plans to develop the Senet Network outside North America.

External links 

 Senet Inc. Website
 EnerTracSE Website
 LoRa® Alliance Website
 Semtech Website

References 

Telecommunications companies established in 2009
American companies established in 2009
2009 establishments in New Hampshire